Proprioseiopsis kogi is a species of mite in the family Phytoseiidae.

References

kogi
Articles created by Qbugbot
Animals described in 1971